St Mary's Church is a Grade I listed parish church in the Church of England in Edwinstowe.

The Boundary Wall, Gate, Steps And Overthrow At Church Of St Mary are also Grade II listed by the Department for Digital, Culture, Media and Sport.

History
The church dates from around 1175. It was restored in 1869 and 1890.

It is visited by tourists, who come to see the church where, according to legend, Robin Hood and Maid Marian were married.

Organ
The organ is by Forster and Andrews dating from 1862. A specification of the organ can be found on the National Pipe Organ Register.

Gallery

References

Edwinstowe
Edwinstowe
Robin Hood
Mary